Pavel Kučera (born 2 July 1976 in Most) is a Czech footballer, who memorably played for Dynamo České Budějovice as a goalkeeper. He played for Viktoria Žižkov in the 2002–03 UEFA Cup.

References

External links
 Profile at club website

1976 births
Living people
Sportspeople from Most (city)
Czech footballers
Association football goalkeepers
Czech First League players
FK Teplice players
FK Chmel Blšany players
FK Viktoria Žižkov players
FK Mladá Boleslav players
SK Dynamo České Budějovice players
FC DAC 1904 Dunajská Streda players
Slovak Super Liga players
Czech expatriate footballers
Expatriate footballers in Slovakia
Czech expatriate sportspeople in Slovakia
Expatriate footballers in Austria
Czech expatriate sportspeople in Austria